Akkireddigudem is a village in Eluru district of the Indian state of Andhra Pradesh. It is administered under of Eluru revenue division.

Demographics 

 Census of India, Ankireddigudem has population of 1300 of which 654 are males while 646 are females.  Average Sex Ratio is 988. Population of children with age 0-6 is 119 which makes up 9.15% of total population of village, Child sex ratio is 776. Literacy rate of the village was 74.43%.

References

Villages in Eluru district